Larry D. Striplin, Jr. (November 11, 1929 – January 23, 2012) was an American college basketball and baseball coach. He was also an influential figure in the state of Alabama's sports, having served on numerous boards for halls of fame.

Born in Selma, Alabama, Striplin attended Albert G. Parish High School before enrolling at Spring Hill College. After two years, Striplin transferred to Birmingham–Southern College where he excelled on the school's swimming, basketball, and baseball teams. He graduated in 1951, then pursued his Master's in Education at Peabody College (part of Vanderbilt University) in Nashville, Tennessee. Upon graduation, Striplin established the men's basketball program at Belmont State College (now Belmont University) and served as their first head coach. At the same time, he assumed the role of Belmont's athletic director, the first in their history, and Striplin started the baseball program. Like basketball, he served as the first head coach, covering for the 1954 and 1955 seasons. His influence on the athletics program was great, and has been referred to as the "patriarch" of the whole program. Striplin left Belmont, and education altogether, in 1956 to pursue business in Jackson, Tennessee. Eventually, Striplin owned his own glass company and did well for himself. In 1975, Striplin joined the Alabama Sports Hall of Fame and spent 23 years on the board, 13 of them as chairman. He continued to push for sports history and preservation in Alabama throughout his life. He has been inducted into the State of Alabama Academy of Honor in 1997, was the 1998 Alabama Sports Hall of Fame's Distinguished Sportsman of the Year, and was later inducted himself in 2007. Belmont's Striplin Gym is named in his honor.
Larry D. Striplin married His college sweetheart, Beverly Ponder Striplin.
They had four children, Larry III, Janet, David, and Cynthia.

Head coaching record

Basketball

Baseball

References

He had 9 grandchildren, Beverly Ann Carter, Katie Carter, Holly Carter, Megan Weavil, Scott Fussell, Lauren Striplin, Taylor Striplin, Christy Striplin and Barrett Striplin. Four Great Grandchildren, Landon Rives, Lilly Smith, Kaitlyn Rives and Clifton Tubbs.

1929 births
2012 deaths
Baseball coaches from Alabama
Basketball coaches from Alabama
Baseball players from Alabama
Basketball players from Alabama
Belmont Bruins athletic directors
Belmont Bruins baseball coaches
Belmont Bruins men's basketball coaches
Birmingham–Southern Panthers baseball players
Birmingham–Southern Panthers men's basketball players
Peabody College alumni
Sportspeople from Selma, Alabama
Sportspeople from Birmingham, Alabama
Spring Hill College alumni
American men's basketball coaches
American men's basketball players